Inge Sedlmaier (4 May 1925 – 13 March 1976) was a German gymnast. She competed in seven events at the 1952 Summer Olympics.

References

External links
 

1925 births
1976 deaths
German female artistic gymnasts
Olympic gymnasts of Germany
Gymnasts at the 1952 Summer Olympics
Sportspeople from Landshut
20th-century German women